Tivoli Hotel may refer to
 Tivoli Hotel, Panama opened 1906, closed 1971
 Tivoli Hotel (Biloxi, Mississippi), opened 1926, demolished 2006
 Tivoli Hotels, brand owned by Minor Hotels